Leandro Karnal (born 1 February 1963) is a Brazilian television personality and former university professor at the Universidade Estadual de Campinas until 2019. Karnal has publications on the subject of History, focusing on the History of the Americas and the History of Religion. He was born in São Leopoldo, and became known in Brazil for his work on popularizing philosophy for the masses; he lectures around the country. In 2020, he became co-host of CNN Tonight, a nightly commentary program at CNN Brasil.

Bibliography
 Oriente Médio (1996)
 A conquista do México (1998)
 Quando Anchieta chegou ao Brasil (1998)
 Teatro da Fé - representação religiosa no Brasil e no México do século XVI (1998)
 A Guerra Fria (2001)
 Estados Unidos: A formação da nação (2001)
 História na sala de aula: Conceitos, práticas e propostas (2003)
 História dos Estados Unidos: das origens ao século XXI (2007) — coauthors: Luís Estevam Fernandes, Marcus Vinicius de Morais, Sean Purdy
 O historiador e suas fontes (2009) — various authors
 Conversas com um jovem professor (2012)
 Pecar e perdoar: Deus e o homem na história (2014)
 As religiões que o mundo esqueceu: Como os egípcios, gregos, celtas, astecas e outros povos cultuavam seus deuses (2015)
 A detração: Breve ensaio sobre o maldizer (2016)
 Felicidade ou morte (2016) — coauthor: Clóvis de Barros Filho
 Verdade e mentiras: Ética e democracia no Brasil (2016) —  coauthors: Gilberto Dimenstein, Luiz Felipe Pondé | Mario Sergio Cortella

References

External links
 Curriculum Lattes

1963 births
Living people
20th-century Brazilian historians
University of São Paulo alumni
Academic staff of the State University of Campinas
People from São Leopoldo
Historians of religion
21st-century Brazilian historians
Brazilian LGBT writers